Nega Network (Hangul: 내가네트워크) is an independent South Korean record label, talent agency, producer, and publisher of pop music, founded by Yoon Il-sang, Lance Yoon-suk Choi and Jo Young-chul. It is based in Gangnam District, Seoul.

History
Nega Network was founded by Yoon Il-sang, Lance Yoon-suk Choi and Jo Young-chul in January 2003.

Artists

Groups
 Lunafly (hiatus)
 Littles

Producers
Kim Eana (Lyricist, work with Kakao M)
Yoon Il Sang (Composer)

Former artists
 Brown Eyed Girls (2006–2015)
 EZ-Life
 iM
 Sunny Hill (2010–2011)
 Springkler
 PDIS (see Cho PD, Yoon Il Sang)
 May Doni
 LC9 (2013–2015)
 Laboum (moved to Interpark Music Plus)
 Yulhee (2014–2017)
 Yujeong (2014–2021)

Notes

References

External links 
   

South Korean record labels
Talent agencies of South Korea
Record labels established in 2003
Labels distributed by Kakao M